Peder Paulsen Balke (4 May 1779 – 6 September 1840) was a Norwegian farmer and non-commissioned officer in the military. He served as a representative at the Norwegian Constitutional Assembly.

Peder Paulsen Balke was born in Østre Toten in Oppland, Norway.  He became a soldier with the Søndenfieldske Dragon-Regiment in 1801. He was a corporal from 1808 and in 1814 was stationed at Kongsberg. In 1812, he married  Mari Andersdatte (1789-1874). Balke took over father's farm Østre Balke in Østre Toten during 1813.

He represented Søndenfieldske Dragon-Regiment at the Norwegian Constituent Assembly in 1814 together with Eilert Waldemar Preben Ramm. Both delegates  supported the position of the independence party (Selvstendighetspartiet). He was the brother in law and cousin of Niels Fredriksen Dyhren, who also attended the Assembly as a representative from the Norske Jæger Corps.

References

External links
Representantene på Eidsvoll 1814 (Cappelen Damm AS)
 Men of Eidsvoll (eidsvollsmenn)

Related Reading
Holme Jørn (2014) De kom fra alle kanter - Eidsvollsmennene og deres hus  (Oslo: Cappelen Damm) 

1779 births
1840 deaths
People from Østre Toten
Norwegian Army personnel
Norwegian military personnel of the Napoleonic Wars
Fathers of the Constitution of Norway